Diesel Loco Shed, Guntakal is an engine shed located in Guntakal, Andhra Pradesh in India.  It falls under the jurisdiction of Guntakal railway division of South Central Railway zone.

It is one of the oldest loco sheds, started in 1964 as a M.G Shed.

Locomotives

References

Guntakal
Rail transport in Andhra Pradesh
1964 establishments in Mysore State
Guntakal railway division
Transport in Guntakal
Transport infrastructure completed in 1964